Vincent Legrend Walters is a Mexican-American murder suspect who was one of the U.S. Marshals Service's 15 Most Wanted Fugitives.

Background
Walters was born in Mexico, but grew up in the San Diego area. In 1988, Walters was caught by an undercover Drug Enforcement Administration operation after allegedly purchasing $20,000 worth of chemicals to make methamphetamine and negotiating a $200,000 deal with the undercover agents.

Walters is accused of the kidnapping and murder of Kristine Suzzette Reyes in September 1988. As the U.S. Marshals described of the crime,

Disappearance and capture
Martin Walters, Vincent's brother, was sentenced to 25 years to life in prison for the kidnapping, but Vincent Walters fled. In July 1989, a federal grand jury indicted Vincent Walters on conspiracy to manufacture, possess and distribute crystal methamphetamine, carrying firearms during a drug trafficking crime, and possession of unregistered firearms and explosives.

According to the Marshals Service, Walters had been living in Cancún, Mexico under the assumed name of "Oscar Rivera". Walters worked for 10 years at Cancún International Airport, where he reportedly sold timeshare vacation packages for a resort located in Puerto Morelos. On July 13, 2012, Walters, age 45, was apprehended at his workplace in Cancún International Airport. Walters faces extradition to San Diego, where he will be tried in the U.S. District Court for the kidnapping and murder of Kristine Suzzette Reyes, and drugs, firearms and explosives offences.

References

American kidnappers
American murderers
Fugitives
Living people
Mexican emigrants to the United States
Year of birth missing (living people)